Golestaneh (also Romanized as Golestāneh) is a village in Bazvand Rural District, Central District, Rumeshkhan County, Lorestan Province, Iran. At the 2006 census, its population was 1,008, in 227 families.

References 

Populated places in Rumeshkhan County